Citizenship of the Mercosur is granted to eligible citizens of the Southern Common Market member states. It was approved in 2010 through the Citizenship Statute and should be fully implemented by the member countries in 2021, when the program will be transformed in an international treaty incorporated into the national legal system of the countries, under the concept of "Mercosur Citizen".

Mercosur citizens have the right to free movement, residence and employment throughout the bloc and in the five associated countries. Citizens still have free transport of goods, services and money, as well as equality of rights, harmonization of social security systems and labor laws.

Benefits for citizens

Travel Documents

Nationals of Member States (Argentina, Brazil, Paraguay and Uruguay) and Associated States (Bolivia, Chile, Colombia, Ecuador and Peru) do not need a passport or visa to travel around the region, with only a national identity card or other document considered valid.

Residence Agreement

The Agreement grants the right to residence and work for citizens with no requirement other than nationality. Citizens of the Member States and Associated States that are part of the agreement enjoy a facilitated procedure for applying for a residence visa, as long as they have a valid passport, birth certificate and a negative certificate of criminal record. It is possible to apply for the grant of "temporary residence" of up to two years in another country of the block. Before the expiry of the term of "temporary residence", the interested parties may request their transformation into permanent residence.

Social Security

The Agreement allows migrant workers and their families to have access to the benefits of social security by allowing nationals of one Member State to have accounted for their working time in another Member State for the purpose of granting retirement, invalidity or death benefits.

Educational Integration

Mercosur has protocols for educational integration, which provide for the revalidation of diplomas, certificates, degrees and the recognition of studies at the fundamental and secondary levels, technical and non-technical. The protocols also cover post-graduate studies. There is also the Regional Accreditation System for Mercosur Undergraduate Courses (ARCU-SUL) and the Integrated Mobility System (SIMERCOSUL).

See also

 Mercosur
 Treaty of Asunción
 Naturalisation
 Visa requirements for Argentine citizens
 Visa requirements for Brazilian citizens
 Visa requirements for Paraguayan citizens
 Visa requirements for Uruguayan citizens

References

External links
 International Official Mercosur website
 Official Brazilian Mercosur website

Mercosur
Human migration
Brazilian nationality law
Transnational citizenship
Law in South America